Fischer's chameleon (Kinyongia fischeri), also known commonly as  the Nguru blade-horned chameleon and the Nguru two-horned chameleon, is a species of chameleon, a lizard in the family Chamaeleonidae. The species is endemic to Tanzania.

Etymology
The specific name, fischeri, is in honor of German herpetologist Johann Gustav Fischer.

Geographic range
K. fischeri is restricted to the Nguru and Nguu Mountains of Tanzania. Chameleons found in other parts of the Eastern Arc Mountains as well as Kenya are now classified as separate species.

Habitat

Taxonomy
A number of other species (K. matschiei, K. multituberculata, K. tavetana, K. uluguruensis, and K. vosseleri ) have been mistakenly called by this species' name or classified as subspecies. In 2008, it was shown that they actually are their own, distinct species. The true Fischer's chameleon is rare with a more restricted distribution than previously believed.

Reproduction
K. fischeri is oviparous.

In captivity
Although formerly considered common in captivity, virtually all "Fischer's chameleons" in the pet trade are now known to actually be other species. Only three true Fischer's chameleon are known to have entered captivity.

References

Further reading
Nečas P (1999). Chamaeleons—Nature's Hidden Jewels. Frankfurt am Main: Edition Chimaira. 348 pp.  (Europe),  (USA, Canada). (Bradypodion fischeri, new combination, p. 191).
Reichenow A (1887). "Neue Wirbelthiere des Zoologischen Museums in Berlin ". Zoologischer Anzeiger 10: 369–372. (Chamaeleon fischeri, new species, pp. 371–372). (in German).
Tilbury CR, Tolley KA, Branch WR (2006). "A review of the systematics of the genus Bradypodion (Sauria: Chamaeleonidae) with the description of two new genera". Zootaxa 1363: 23–38. (Kinyongia fischeri, new combination).

Kinyongia
Lizards of Africa
Reptiles of Tanzania
Endemic fauna of Tanzania
Taxa named by Anton Reichenow
Reptiles described in 1887